Frederick Cook (1865–1940) was American explorer and physician.

Frederick Cook may also refer to:

Frederick Cook (American politician) (1833–1905), Secretary of State of New York, 1886–1889
Frederick Cook (Australian politician) (1883–1971), Victorian state politician
Frederick Cook (cricketer) (1870–1915), South African cricketer
F. N. Cook (Frederick Norton Cook, 1905–1985), Australian naval officer
Sir Frederick Cook, 2nd Baronet (1844–1920), British textiles trader and Conservative Party politician
Bun Cook (Frederick Joseph Cook, 1903–1988), Canadian ice hockey player and coach

See also
Fred Cook (disambiguation)
Frederic Cook (disambiguation)